Sphingulus is a genus of moths in the family Sphingidae, containing only one species, Sphingulus mus, the murine hawkmoth.

Distribution 
Is found from the south-eastern part of the Russian Far East and the Korean Peninsula south into eastern China.

Description 
The wingspan is 57–60 mm.

Biology 
In northern China, there is one generation per year with adults on wing in May and June. In north-eastern China and the Russian Far East, there is probably partial second generation with adults on wing in July and August in some years. In Korea, adults have been recorded from June to July.

Larvae have been reared on Fraxinus species.

References

Sphingulini
Monotypic moth genera
Taxa named by Otto Staudinger
Moths of Asia